The Holberg Prize is an international prize awarded annually by the government of Norway to outstanding scholars for work in the arts, humanities, social sciences, law and theology, either within one of these fields or through interdisciplinary work. The prize is named after the Danish-Norwegian writer and academic Ludvig Holberg (1684–1754). The Holberg Prize comes with a monetary award of 6 million Norwegian kroner (NOK) (approximately $750 000 or €660 000), which are intended to be used to further the research of the recipient. The winner of the Holberg Prize is announced in March, and the award ceremony takes place every June in Bergen, Norway.

According to a reputation survey conducted in 2018, the Holberg Prize is the most prestigious interdisciplinary award in the social sciences (jointly with the Stein Rokkan Prize for Comparative Social Science Research).

History 
The prize was established by the Parliament of Norway in honor of Ludvig Holberg in 2003 and complements its sister prize in mathematics, the Abel Prize. Ludvig Holberg, who excelled in all the disciplines covered by the award, played an important part in bringing the Enlightenment to the Nordic countries and is also well known as a playwright and author. The objective of the prize was to increase awareness of the value of academic scholarship in the arts, humanities, social sciences, law and theology. It has been described as the "Nobel Prize" for the arts and humanities, social sciences, law and theology.

Selection criteria 
The Holberg Prize is awarded annually to scholars who have made "outstanding contributions to research in the arts and humanities, social sciences, law or theology." Scholars holding positions at universities and other research institutions, including academies, are eligible to nominate candidates to the Holberg Prize and the Nils Klim Prize. Self-nominations are not permitted. The Holberg Board awards the prize at the recommendation of the Holberg Committee.The Holberg Committee meets twice. At the first meeting, in early fall, they choose a shortlist from the nominations. The Committee then gather assessments on the short-list candidates from internationally recognized scholars before giving their final recommendation to the Board.

Organization 

The Holberg Prize is funded through a direct allocation from the Norwegian government's budget. It is administered by the University of Bergen on behalf of the Ministry of Education and Research. The University of Bergen appoints the executive board of the Holberg Prize. The Holberg Board consists of the board chair and five board members. The board members must work in different institutions, and at least one board member must work outside the university and university college sector. Board members are appointed for a period of four years and may be reappointed once. The current Holberg Board is composed of: Kjersti Fløttum (Chair, University of Bergen), Knut Olav Åmås (Fritt Ord), Lise Rye (Norwegian University of Science and Technology), Hans Petter Graver (University of Oslo), Siv Ellen Kraft (University of Tromsø) and Torkild Hovde Lyngstad (University of Oslo). 

The Holberg Board awards the prize at the recommendation of the Holberg Committee who consists of five outstanding researchers in the arts and humanities, social sciences, law and theology. The current Holberg Prize Academic Committee is composed of: Graeme Turner (Committee chairman, The University of Queensland), Mary Beard (University of Cambridge), David Nirenberg (University of Chicago), Heike Krieger (Free University of Berlin), Maurice Crul (Vrije Universiteit Amsterdam) and Cui Zhiyuan (Tsinghua University.)

Previous members of the Holberg Committee are among others: Mary Jacobus (University of Cambridge), Helga Nowotny (ETH Zurich), Kwame Anthony Appiah (New York University), Toril Moi (Duke University), Stein Kuhnle (The Norwegian Academy og Science and Letters), Johan P. Olsen (University of Bergen), and Pratap Bhanu Mehta (Center for policy research).

Laureates

The Holberg Week 
During The Holberg Week in June, The Holberg Prize hosts a series of lectures, discussions and other events in honor of the Holberg Laureate and the Nils Klim Laureate. The events feature the laureates, as well as other high-profile international scholars. The program feature, among other things, the Holberg Symposium, the Nils Klim Seminar and the Holberg Lecture. All events during the Holberg week, with the exception of the award ceremony and government banquet, are open to all and have free entrance. Several of the events are also livestreamed, and available to an international audience.

The Holberg Debate 
The Holberg Debate is an annual event organised by the Holberg Prize. The debate is inspired by Ludvig Holberg's Enlightenment ideas and aims to explore pressing issues of our time. The Holberg Debate was organised for the first time in 2016 and has since been held annually, on the first Saturday in December. The aim is both to see important voices debate pressing issues of our time and to highlight the relevance of the academic fields covered by the Holberg Prize: the humanities, social sciences, law and theology. Thus, the Holberg Debate seeks to engage both the university community and the public at large, and seeks to invite well known thinkers with a diverse background, including academics, journalists, authors, film makers and activists.

Former participants in the Holberg Debate are Slavoj Žižek, Timothy Garton Ash, Jostein Gripsrud, Jonathan Heawood, John Pilger and Julian Assange.

Other prizes 
As part of its research dissemination targeting younger people, the Holberg Prize also awards two other prizes:

The Nils Klim Prize is awarded annually to a younger Nordic researcher who has made an outstanding contribution to research in the arts and humanities, social science, law or theology.
The Holberg Prize School Project is a research competition for students in the upper secondary schools in Norway.

Symposiums 
The Holberg Symposium is held annually in honor of the winner of The Holberg Prize. The event hosts prominent speakers who partake in a symposium dedicated to The Holberg Prize laureate.

Symposium in Honor of Julia Kristeva, 2004 – "Thinking About Liberty in Dark Times"
 Participants: Kelly Oliver, Sara Beardsworth, John Fletcher, Atle Kittang and Iréne Matthis.
 Symposium in Honor of Jürgen Habermas, 2005 – "Religion in the Public Sphere"
 Participants: Arne Johan Vetlesen, Gunnar Skirbekk, Cristina Lafont, Cathrine Holst, Helge Høibraaten, Craig Calhoun, Thomas M. Schmidt, Jon Hellesnes, Hauke Brunkhorst and Tore Lindholm.
 Symposium in Honor of Shmuel Eisenstadt, 2006 – "The Processes that Change the World"
 Participants: Jack A. Goldstone, Jonathan Friedman, Sverre Bagge, Johann P. Arnason, Donald Levine, Bernhard Giesen, Shalini Randeria, Jeffrey Alexander, Fredrik Barth, Rajeev Bhargava, Said Amir Arjomand, Shalini Randeria, Luis Roniger, Nina Witoszek-FitzPatrick, Yehuda Elkana, Georg Klein, Bernt Hagtvet and Jeffrey Alexander.
 Symposium in Honor of Ronald Dworkin, 2007
 Participants: Jan Fridthjof Bernt, Stephen Guest, Frank Henry Sommer, Jeremy Bentham's severed head, Jeremy Waldron, Peter Koller, Rebecca Brown, Seana Shiffrin, Thomas Nagel, Rainer Forst, Dietmar von der Pfordten and Synne Sæther Mæhle.
 Symposium in Honor of Fredric Jameson, 2008
 Participants: William A. Lane, Jr, Astrid Söderbergh Widding, Paik Nak-chung, Maria Elisa Cevasco, Wang Hui, Michael Löwy, Perry Anderson, Sara Danius, Helmut F. Stern and Xiaobing Tang.
 Symposium in Honor of Ian Hacking, 2009
 Participants: Ragnar Fjelland, Professor Dagfinn Føllesdal, Bruna De Marchi and Merle Jacob.
 Symposium in Honor of Natalie Zemon Davies, 2010 – "Doing decentered history – the global in the local"
 Participants: Bonnie G. Smith, David Abulafia, Joan W. Scott, Ida Blom and Erling Sverdrup Sandmo.
 Symposium in Honor of Jürgen Kocka, 2011 – "Civil Society and the Welfare State: Competitors or allies?"
 Participants: Theda Skocpol, Christoph Conrad, Per Selle, Simone Lässig, Stein Kuhnle and Ivar Bleiklie.
 Symposium in Honor of Manuel Castells, 2012 – "Media and Democracy"
 Participants: Ivar Bleiklie, Helga Nowotny, Göran Therborn, Helen Margetts, Andrew Chadwick, Jostein Gripsrud, Terhi Rantanen, Annabelle Sreberny, William Dutton and Mette Andersson.
 Symposium in Honor of Bruno Latour, 2013 – "From Economics to Ecology".
 Participants: Barbara Czarniawska, Dominique Pestre, Mike Hulme, Bronislaw Szerszynski, Oliver Morton, Adam Lowe,
 Symposium in Honor of Michael Cook, 2014 – "Ancient Religions, Modern Dissent".
 Participants: Guy Stroumsa, Sabine Schmidtke, Maribel Fierro, Petra Sijpesteijn, Muhammad Qasim Zaman, and Mona Siddiqui.
 Symposium in Honor of Marina Warner, 2015 – "Myth, Homelessness, and the "Country of Words”". 
 Participants: Wendy Doniger, Roy Foster, Finbarr Barry Flood, Wen-chin Ouyang, and Tamim al-Barghouti. 
 Symposium in Honor of Stephen Greenblatt, 2016 – "Art in life/Life in art".
 Participants: Horst Bredekamp, Joseph Koerner,  Pippa Skotnes, Homi Bhabha, Adam Phillips, Sarah Cole, Louis Menand, and Daniel Jütte. 
 Symposium in Honor of Onora O'Neill, 2017 – "Ethics for Communication".
 Participants: Jonathan Heawood, Rowan Cruft, Laura Valentini, Steven Barnett, and Rae Langton. 
 Symposium in Honor of Cass Sunstein, 2018 – "Democracy and Truth".
 Participants: Tali Sharot, Tyler Cowen, Samantha Power, Lawrence Lessig
Symposium in Honor of Paul Gilroy, 2019 – "From Double Consciousness to Planetary Humanism".
Participants: Temi Odumosu, Sivamohan Valluvan, Lidia Curti, and Katherine McKittrick.
Symposium in Honor of Griselda Pollock, 2020, will take place 2021.

See also

 List of history awards
 List of philosophy awards
 List of religion-related awards
 List of social sciences awards

References

External links 
 The Holberg Prize website
 Reactions, from the Norwegian researchers' association
 Debate, from forskning.no
 Jon Elster: Too much politeness, too little quality, about Norwegian academic life in general and the Holberg Prize in particular

Awards established in 2003
Norwegian awards
Social sciences awards
Philosophy awards
History awards
2003 establishments in Norway